Traicionera is a Mexican telenovela produced by Televisa for Telesistema Mexicano in 1963.

Cast 
Anita Blanch
Luis Aragón
Maruja Grifell
 
Rita Macedo
Maricruz Olivier

References

External links 

Mexican telenovelas
1963 telenovelas
Televisa telenovelas
1963 Mexican television series debuts
1963 Mexican television series endings
Spanish-language telenovelas